Janqur may refer to:
 Janqur, Heris
 Janqur, Tabriz